Kenenisa Bekele Beyecha (born 13 June 1982) is an Ethiopian long-distance runner. He was the world record holder in both the 5000-metre and 10000-metre from 2004 (5,000m) and 2005 (10,000m) until 2020. He won the gold medal in both the 5000 m and 10,000 m events at the 2008 Summer Olympics. At the 2004 Olympics, he won the gold medal in the 10,000 m and the silver medal in the 5000 m.

He is the most successful runner in the history of the IAAF World Cross Country Championships, with six long (12 km) course and five short (4 km) course titles. He won the 10,000 m title at the World Championships in Athletics in 2003, 2005, 2007 and 2009 (matching Haile Gebrselassie's four in a row win streak). Kenenisa was unbeaten over 10,000 m from his debut in 2003 until 2011, when he failed to finish at the World Championships final.

At the 2009 World Championships in Athletics he became the first man to win both 5000 m and 10,000 m title at the same championships. Over 5000 m he has also won an Olympic silver (2004), World Championship bronze (2003), two African Championship titles and one All-Africa Games gold medal. He also won the 3000 metres title at the 2006 World Indoor Championships.

On 6 April 2014, he produced the sixth fastest marathon debut ever on a record-eligible course with his victory at the Paris Marathon, in a course record time of 2:05:04. On 25 September 2016, Kenenisa won the Berlin Marathon in a time of 2:03:03, a new personal best, then the third-fastest marathon of all time. On 29 September 2019, he again won the Berlin Marathon in a time of 2:01:41, two seconds slower than the then world record of 2:01:39 set by Eliud Kipchoge in the 2018 Berlin Marathon. Considering his accomplishments in cross country, track, and road racing, many consider him to be the greatest distance runner of all time.

Career

Early life and career
Kenenisa Bekele was born in 1982 at Bekoji, Arsi Zone, the same town as the Dibaba sisters (Ejegayehu, Tirunesh and Genzebe) and their cousin Derartu Tulu.

In March 2001, he won the IAAF World Junior Cross Country title by a full 33 seconds. Five months later, in August 2001, he set a new 3000 metres world junior record by running 7:30.67 minutes in Brussels. The record lasted for three and a half years, being broken by Augustine Choge with a run of 7:28.78 minutes.
In December 2000 and 2001 Kenenisa won the 15k roadrace Montferland Run in the Netherlands.

For five years in a row, from 2002 (at the age of 19) through 2006, he took both short (4 k m) and long (12 k m) races at the IAAF World Cross Country Championships, a feat no other runner has accomplished even once. After the IAAF eliminated the short course race in 2007, Kenenisa won a final long course race in 2008, bringing his World Cross Country medal totals to 11 senior individual gold medals (6 long course, 5 short course), 1 senior silver medal (2001), 1 junior gold medal (2001), 2 team gold medals (2004, 2005), 3 team silver medals (2002, 2003, & 2008), and 1 team bronze medal (2006) for a grand total of 19 medals.

Kenenisa is renowned for his ability to accelerate very quickly at the end of a long-distance race; in Oslo in June 2003, he chased after Kenyan Abraham Chebii and won the race in 12:52.26.

He has faced fellow Ethiopian, Haile Gebrselassie, twice in road competition, once in cross country, and six times on the track. Haile defeated Kenenisa on the track in the 2000 Nurnberg 5000 metres, the 2001 Great Ethiopian Run 10 km, and the Cross de l'Acier in December 2001, but lost to Kenenisa in Hengelo 2003 over 10,000 m (26:53 to 26:54), Rome 2003 over 5000 m (12:57 to 13:00), Paris 2003 World Championships over 10,000 m (26:49 to 26:50), Athens 2004 Olympic Games (27:05 to 27:27), in the 10,000 m in the Beijing 2008 Olympic Games (27:01 to 27:06), and in the Great North Run half marathon in September 2013 (60:09 to 60:41).

Kenenisa's outstanding track career led to his involvement in a project to break the two-hour barrier for the marathon, though a number of factors undermined this effort.

2004 season 
In 2004, he broke the world records for the indoor 5000 m, outdoor 5000 m and outdoor 10,000 m (both in a timeframe of 9 days). He won the short and long course world cross country titles, leading Ethiopia to the senior men's team title. He also won a gold medal in the men's 10,000 metres and a silver medal in the men's 5000 metres in the 2004 Olympic Games in Athens.

2005 season 
On 4 January 2005, Kenenisa's fiancée, 18-year-old Alem Techale, died of an apparent heart attack while on a training run with him. Although it was initially stated that no autopsy was performed, Alem and his manager, Jos Hermens, later said that an autopsy had revealed nothing conclusive about Techale's death. She was the 2003 World Youth Champion in the 1500 metres and in excellent physical condition.

He resumed racing on 29 January, and lost indoors over 3000 m to Ireland's Alistair Cragg after sprinting towards the line with one and a half laps to go, while thinking that there was only half a lap left. A few weeks later he lost to fellow Ethiopian Markos Geneti over two miles.

In March, Kenenisa lined up to defend his long and short course titles at the 2005 IAAF World Cross Country Championships. He won on the short course despite a fast pace set by Qatari Saif Saaeed Shaheen, and followed that win with a long course victory the next day over Eritrean Zersenay Tadese and Kenyan rival Eliud Kipchoge.

On 8 August 2005, Kenenisa Bekele won the gold medal in the 10,000 m at the 2005 World Championships in Helsinki with a stunning last 200 m spurt.

On 26 August 2005, Kenenisa set the 10,000 m world record 26:17.53 at the 29th Memorial Van Damme meeting in Brussels, slicing nearly three seconds off his previous world record 26:20.31, and running with 5000 m splits of 13:09 and 13:08 minutes. The race saw 6 runners finishing in less than 27 minutes, with Sammy Wanjiru dipping in 26:41.75, a new world junior record. At the end of 2005 Kenenisa was voted the Track & Field News magazine athlete of the year for the second year in a row.

2006–2007

When Kenenisa won the 3000 m at the 2006 IAAF World Indoor Championships in Moscow, he became the first athlete in history to be Olympic champion, world outdoor track champion, world indoor track champion, and world cross country champion.

In 2006 he won five out of six IAAF Golden League events (5000 m) in the same season, which earned him a total of US$83,333.

On 17 February 2007, he broke the indoor world record over 2000 m in Birmingham, with a time of 4:49.99. His spectacular final 300 m aided this time which would be considered excellent even outdoors.

On 24 March 2007, however, his remarkable racing streak of 27 consecutive victories in cross country races (dating back to his last previous loss in December 2001) came to an end when after leading the race in the penultimate lap of the 2007 IAAF World Cross Country Championships in Mombasa he succumbed to the very hot, humid conditions (which caused more than 1/6 of all competitors to drop out) and was passed by eventual winner Zersenay Tadese on the last lap before Kenenisa dropped out. This was greeted with cheers by the Kenyan crowds, an occurrence which has been frowned upon by the wider athletics community.

He recovered from that rare failure to take the 10,000-metre title at the 2007 IAAF World Championships in Osaka, once again besting his compatriot Sileshi Sihine. During that race, he looked like he was going to be dropped several times over the last 800 metres, but recovered to overtake Sileshi with 150 metres to go and take his third straight world title.

Beijing Olympics and Berlin World Championships

In Edinburgh on 30 March 2008, he won his sixth World Cross Country title (long course – 12k), breaking the three-way tie of 5 wins he had previously shared with Paul Tergat and John Ngugi. With this win, Kenenisa laid sole claim to most decorated athlete in IAAF World Cross Country Championships history. He has won 6 long course (12k) individual gold medals, 5 short course (4k) gold medals, 1 junior championship (8k), and 4 team gold medals for a sum total of 16 gold medals. His overall medal count (both individual and team results) stands at 27 medals: 16 gold, 9 silver and 2 bronze.

On 17 August 2008 Kenenisa won gold in the 10,000m finals with a time of 27:01.17, setting a new Olympic Record in the process. In a race in which 20 men broke the 28-minute barrier and four finished under his 2004 Olympic record of 27:05.10, he needed his renowned finishing kick to pull out the victory, running a 53.42-second final 400 metres (similar to the 53.02-second final 400-metre sprint he used to win the gold medal in Athens in 2004 over the same distance).

On 23 August 2008 Kenenisa bested his competitors and won the 5000-metre finals, shattering Saïd Aouita's Olympic Record by almost eight seconds with a time of 12:57.82. The race was remarkable for his manner of doing most of the pacing himself before accelerating to a scintillating finish: his last 3000 metres only took 7:35.53, his final 2000 metres 4:56.97, last 1600 metres 3:57.01 (=3:58.4 final mile) and his final lap a punishing 53.87 seconds.-

By winning the 10,000/5000m double in the Beijing Olympics, Kenenisa joined another elite group of athletes: Hannes Kolehmainen (1912), Emil Zátopek (1952), Vladimir Kuts (1956), Lasse Virén (twice, in 1972 and 1976) and Miruts Yifter (1980).

Kenenisa Bekele won two gold medals at the 2009 World Championships in Athletics, held in Berlin. His double victories in 5000m (13:17.09) and 10,000m (26:46.31 – a World Championships Record) were unprecedented and by doing this became the first man to take both the long-distance track gold medals at the same World Championships. His talent combination of endurance and speed has made it nearly impossible to defeat Kenenisa when he is at full strength. During the 10,000m race in which he was running behind Eritrea's Zersenay Tadesse, the broadcaster declared "it is over, in fact it was over from the start" as the final lap began and Kenenisa turned an ostensibly close race into a blowout. The IAAF announcer concluded, "this man is probably the greatest distance runner we will ever see."

In spite of his unrivalled success in athletics, Kenenisa did not experience the mainstream appeal that others such as Haile Gebrselassie did. His quiet demeanour and aversion to interviews did not make him a highly marketable athlete in the Western world. Fellow world record holder Usain Bolt stated that Kenenisa Bekele's achievements had not received the recognition that they deserved.

Injuries

Kenenisa made a disappointing start to 2010, finishing fourth in the Edinburgh Cross Country in a race he was favored to win – a trio of Kenyan athletes ran him out of the contest over the final lap. He spent the entirety of the indoor and outdoor seasons out with a ruptured calf muscle.

2011 World Championships and 2012 Olympics
Kenenisa Bekele finally returned to training after a knee injury in March 2011. Having not raced on the track since 2009, Kenenisa returned for the World Championships. He dropped out of the 10,000m with 10 laps remaining. Kenenisa decided not to run the 5000 m and returned to the Diamond League at the Ivo Van Damme Memorial in Brussels where he set the fastest time in the world for the 10,000 metres in 2011.

Kenenisa's 2012 season did not start well, as he was a lowly eleventh place at the Edinburgh Cross Country. In April, he appeared to have returned to form by winning the Great Ireland Run in a new personal best time for a 10 km road race of 27:49, improving the course record by 46 seconds.

In the 2012 London Olympics 10,000m race he ran within the leading group for the whole race, but could not keep up with the Mo Farah's sprint in the last 150 metres and eventually finished fourth, with a time of 27:32.44, just 1.01 second outside the bronze medalist, his brother Tariku.

In his first race of 2013 he won the Great Ireland Run for a second time.
Kenenisa then won the Great North Run half marathon in a time of 60:09, beating Mo Farah by just one second after making a move that Farah couldn't match with just less than 12 miles gone.

Marathon career

2014
Kenenisa Bekele started his marathon career in the 2014 Paris Marathon on 6 April 2014. His marathon debut was very successful as he bettered both the Paris course record and the debut marathon times of past legends Haile Gebrselassie, Paul Tergat and Samuel Wanjiru by running 2:05:04 to win.

Kenenisa then went on to compete in the 2014 Chicago Marathon on 12 October 2014. He finished fourth in 2:05:51, 1min 40s behind Kenya's Eliud Kipchoge.

2015
On 23 January 2015, Kenenisa Bekele took on the Dubai Marathon, where he had to retire from the race after 30 km.

He was planned to compete in the 2015 London Marathon but had to withdraw due to a persistent injury to his right Achilles tendon. Following 11 months of injury, Kenenisa returned to racing at the 2016 London Marathon. Prior to the race he indicated he was only currently at 90% fitness. Kenenisa finished in 3rd place behind winner Eliud Kipchoge and runner-up Stanley Biwott in a time of 2:06:36. This performance was despite the fact he only returned to jogging in early 2016 following injury and had only completed 6 weeks of specific marathon training. He was also hampered in the race by missing his drinks at 5 separate stations, due to them being used by the designated pacemakers.

2016: Berlin Marathon win
On 24 April, he placed third at the 2016 London Marathon with a time of two hours six minutes and 38 seconds. In September he won the 2016 Berlin Marathon in a time of 2:03:03 which set a new personal best time for him at the Marathon distance and the second fastest marathon of all time.

2017
On 19 January 2017, attempting to break the world record, Kenenisa dropped out of the Dubai Marathon after the half way mark due to a fall at the beginning of the race.
On 23 April 2017, Kenenisa finished second in the London Marathon, finishing in 2:05:57, 9 seconds behind winner Daniel Wanjiru.

2018
Kenenisa ran the 2018 London Marathon in April and came in sixth place with a time of 2:08:53.

He also ran the Amsterdam marathon in October 2018 but dropped out due to injury with about 2 km to go.

2019: Berlin Marathon win
Kenenisa won the 2019 Berlin Marathon in September in 2:01:41, the second fastest time ever and just two seconds off of the world record set by Eliud Kipchoge on the same course the previous year. After the run he stated that he still believes that he can break the world record.

2020
Kenenisa won the London half marathon on 1 March 2020 in 60:22. He improved on the course record set by Mo Farah in 2019 by 1:18. Chris Thompson came in second with 61:07, also within the former course record.

2021
Kenenisa Bekele returned to the Berlin Marathon in September, where he placed third in 2:06:47. The race was won by his compatriot Guye Adola in 2:05:45, while Kenya's Bethwel Yegon finished second. In November, he finished six at the 2021 New York City Marathon with a time of 2:12:52.

2022
In September, he placed third at the Great North Run half marathon in a time of 1:01:01. The next month, Kenenisa competed in the 2022 London Marathon, finishing fifth in 2:05:53 to set a masters world record in age 40 group.

Personal life
On 18 November 2007, Kenenisa married Ethiopian film actress Danawit Gebregziabher in Addis Ababa. Kenenisa has one younger brother, Tariku Bekele, who is also an accomplished world-class distance runner.

Statistics

Personal bests

Yearly progression

Competition record

International competitions
Note: XC stands for cross country

Marathons

World Grand Prix Finals

World Marathon Majors results timeline

Circuit honours
IAAF Golden League jackpot winner: 2006, 2009
Montferland Run 15K: 2000, 2001
Giro al Sas 11K: 2001
Memorial Peppe Greco 10K: 2003
Cross country wins
Tilburg Warandeloop: 2000
Cinque Mulini: 2002
Lotto Cross Cup Brussels: 2002
Oeiras International Cross Country: 2002, 2003
Campaccio: 2002, 2004
Cross Internacional Juan Muguerza: 2003
Trofeo Alasport: 2003
Cross Internacional de Itálica: 2003, 2004, 2007
Cross Internacional de Venta de Baños: 2004
Great Edinburgh International Cross Country: 2006, 2007, 2008

Awards
IAAF World Athlete of the Year: 2004, 2005
Track & Field News Athlete of the Year: 2004, 2005
Ethiopian Person of the Year: 2007/2008

References

External links

 
 IAAF: Focus on Athletes
 
 

1982 births
Living people
Sportspeople from Oromia Region
Oromo people
Ethiopian male long-distance runners
Ethiopian male marathon runners
Olympic athletes of Ethiopia
Olympic gold medalists for Ethiopia
Olympic silver medalists for Ethiopia
Athletes (track and field) at the 2004 Summer Olympics
Athletes (track and field) at the 2008 Summer Olympics
Athletes (track and field) at the 2012 Summer Olympics
Medalists at the 2004 Summer Olympics
Medalists at the 2008 Summer Olympics
World Athletics Championships athletes for Ethiopia
World Athletics Championships medalists
World Athletics Cross Country Championships winners
Berlin Marathon male winners
Paris Marathon male winners
Olympic gold medalists in athletics (track and field)
Olympic silver medalists in athletics (track and field)
African Games gold medalists for Ethiopia
African Games medalists in athletics (track and field)
World Athletics indoor record holders
IAAF Golden League winners
Track & Field News Athlete of the Year winners
Athletes (track and field) at the 2003 All-Africa Games
World Athletics Indoor Championships winners
World Athletics Championships winners
IAAF World Athletics Final winners